During the 2017–18 season, SD Eibar participated in the Spanish La Liga and the Copa del Rey.

Squad

Transfers
List of Spanish football transfers summer 2017#Eibar

In

Out

Pre-season and friendlies

|}

Competitions

Overall

Liga

League table

Results summary

Matches

Copa del Rey

Matches

Round of 32

Statistics

Appearances and goals
Last updated on 26 December 2017.

|-
! colspan=14 style=background:#dcdcdc; text-align:center|Goalkeepers

|-
! colspan=14 style=background:#dcdcdc; text-align:center|Defenders

|-
! colspan=14 style=background:#dcdcdc; text-align:center|Midfielders

|-
! colspan=14 style=background:#dcdcdc; text-align:center|Forwards

|-
! colspan=14 style=background:#dcdcdc; text-align:center| Players who have made an appearance or had a squad number this season but have left the club
|-

|}

Cards
Accounts for all competitions. Last updated on 26 December 2017.

Clean sheets
Last updated on 26 December 2017.

References

External links

SD Eibar seasons
SD Eibar